Dorkovo Museum in Dorkovo, Bulgaria, established in 2013 in a domed wooden structure, has a display of fossils collected from the Pliocene geological epoch of about five million years ago around the village of Dorkovo, a life-size model of a gomphothere, related to elephants, and a diorama.

History
During 1983 a team of paleontologists from Bulgaria and France carried out excavations in and around Dorkovo which unearthed fossils of 5-million-year-old prehistoric mammals of the Pliocene geological epoch. The study was supported by the National Museum of Natural History. The museum was created only 30 years later at the site by the National Museum of Natural History, artists and those associated with the excavations at Dorkovo to display the fossils, a gomphothere model and other animal sculptures, and a diorama based on the Pliocene animals and forest. Funding for the museum was provided under the regional development of the European Union (EU).

The museum was inaugurated on 19 September 2013 by Rosen Plevneliev, President of Bulgaria.

Features
The museum, set amidst the forest, showcases of some of the fossil findings of the excavations, which revealed mostly gomphotheres (extinct elephant relatives). It is housed in a domed structure made of wood both on the inner and outer surfaces, which measures . Apart from the fossils collected from the field,  the major attraction in the museum is model of a gomphothere of the species of Anancus arvernensis, which was made by the Simeon Stoilov Studio. It measures  in height. The  diorama on the interior wooden walls of the museum measures  and was painted there by Velizar, the "painter-animalist" of the Field Museum, Chicago, and shows examples not only of proboscideans but also monkeys, Hipparion horses, and forests.

References

Museums in Bulgaria
Paleontology in Bulgaria
Evolutionary biology
Fossil museums
Historical geology
Tourist attractions in Pazardzhik Province
2013 establishments in Bulgaria
Museums established in 2013